Dmitri Sergeyevich Lavrishchev (born 23 December 1998) is a Russian football player. He plays for Forte Taganrog.

Club career
He made his debut in the Russian Professional Football League for FC Rotor-2 Volgograd on 6 April 2018, in a game against FC Dynamo Bryansk.

Lavrishchev only made a single appearance with Rotor's parent club before leaving at the end of the 2018–19 season.

Honours

Individual
 Russian Professional Football League Zone Center best young player (2018–19).

References

External links
 
 
 Profile by Russian Professional Football League
 Profile by Russian Football National League

1998 births
Living people
Russian footballers
Sportspeople from Lipetsk Oblast
Association football forwards
FC Rotor Volgograd players
FC Noah players
FC Lokomotiv Gomel players
Russian First League players
Russian Second League players
Armenian Premier League players
Russian expatriate footballers
Expatriate footballers in Armenia
Expatriate footballers in Belarus